Aristobia quadrifasciata is a species of beetle in the family Cerambycidae. It was described by Per Olof Christopher Aurivillius in 1916 and is known from Sumatra and Malaysia.

Subspecies
 Aristobia quadrifasciata malasiaca Jiroux, Garreau, Bentanachs & Prévost, 2014
 Aristobia quadrifasciata quadrifasciata Aurivillius, 1916

References

Lamiini
Beetles described in 1916